Thore Westermoen (born 17 September 1949 in Mandal) is a Norwegian politician for the Christian Democratic Party.

He is the son of Toralf Westermoen, who among other things is a former member of the national Parliament. Thore Westermoen himself served as a deputy representative to the Parliament of Norway from Vest-Agder during the terms 1989–1993, 1997–2001 and 2005–2009.

Following the 1999 election, Westermoen became the new county mayor (fylkesordfører). He was re-elected in 2003 and 2007. After the 2011 Norwegian local elections the local alliance he led was dissolved. He was offered the county mayor post if the Christian Democratics cooperated with Labour, but they rejected. Westermoen was relegated to deputy county mayor.

From 1986 to 1989 he was a member of the board of Norwegian State Railways, before advancing to deputy chairman of the board, a position he held from 1990 to 1993.

References

1949 births
Living people
People from Mandal, Norway
Vest-Agder politicians
Christian Democratic Party (Norway) politicians
Deputy members of the Storting
Chairmen of County Councils of Norway
Norwegian State Railways (1883–1996) people